Chunda was the eldest son of Maharana Lakha, the ruler of Mewar. He is known in history for his sacrifice of his rights to the throne, to keep his promise. He was the heir-apparent until he renounced his right in favour of the heir born from Hansa Bai, the Rathore princess who was married to  Maharana Lakha.

Early life
Chunda, was the eldest out of eight issues of Rao Lakha. Ranmal Rathore, the eldest son of Rao Chunda of Marwar was discontented with his fate in Mandore, as his father made Kanha as the heir apparent. He arrived in Mewar, where Rana Lakha granted him the jagir of Dhanla. Ranmal sent a marriage proposal of his sister Hansa Bai to the heir apparent of Mewar, but when the proposal arrived in the court, Rana Lakha jested with the delegation, remarking the proposal was obviously not for him. Chunda, who was on a mission then, was absent from the court. On his return, Chunda came to know that the whole event, he rejected the offer. To avoid making an issue by returning the proposal, it was proposed to Ranmal that he should marry his sister to Maharana Lakha. To this, Ranmal made an objection saying Rana Lakha already had an heir to the throne, so if it is promised that HansaBai's child would be the heir then he would accept this proposal. Chunda made this promise and after the birth of Mokal, Chunda kept his promise and renounced the throne of Mewar.  Chunda was granted the right of state administration.

Later life
After the death of Maharana Lakha, Mokal became the Maharana of Mewar. Chunda managed the state administration, but queen mother Hansa Bai suspected that there could be foul play by Chunda, so Chunda left the court of Mewar and moved to Mandu. But he gave his younger brother Raghavdev the responsibility to look after Mokal and keep an eye on the influence of Rathores under Ranmal, over the state administration of Mewar. With Chunda gone to Mandu, Ranmal consolidated the power. The grandson of Hansa Bai and Lakha Singh, Rana Kumbha ascended the throne after Mokal was killed by Chacha and Mera. Raghavedev was assassinated by Ranmal. With the increasing influence of Ranmal over Mewar State administration, there was discontent among people. Chunda was called back and soon after Ranmal was killed. Chunda then captured Mandore from Rathores. Chunda then served his nephew Rana Kumbha till he died.

The ruins of Chunda's house are near the Kalika Mata Temple in Chittorgarh Fort.

Chunda's descendants are known as Chundawat, who held the hereditary role of managing the State administration, while Maharana ruled. Chundawats had the right to ratify any decision made by Maharana by signing a mark of the spear on every official document. Chundawat Chief of Salumbar, being the eldest branch of Chundawat held this role in the State of Mewar.

References

 
 
 

Mewar dynasty
Hindu monarchs